Kirill Nikonorov (born January 8, 1990) is a Russian professional ice hockey player. He is currently playing with Lada Togliatti in the Kontinental Hockey League.

References

External links

1990 births
Living people
HC CSK VVS Samara players
HC Lada Togliatti players
Russian ice hockey forwards